George Walton (3 December 1863 – 30 June 1921) was an English cricketer. Walton was a right-handed batsman who bowled right-arm fast-medium. He was born at Belgrave, Leicestershire.

Walton made his first-class debut for Leicestershire against the Marylebone Cricket Club in 1894 at Lord's. He made seven further first-class appearances for Leicestershire in 1894, with his final first-class appearance coming against Nottinghamshire in the 1895 County Championship. In nine matches, he scored a total of 88 runs at an average of 6.76, with a high score of 24, while with the ball he took 17 wickets at a bowling average of 24.94, with best figures of 4/64.

He died at the place of his birth on 30 June 1921.

References

External links
George Walton at ESPNcricinfo
George Walton at CricketArchive

1863 births
1921 deaths
Cricketers from Leicester
English cricketers
Leicestershire cricketers
People from Belgrave, Leicester